Milstead, also known as Cowles or Cowles Station, is an unincorporated community in Macon County, Alabama, United States.

History
The community was named after the location where a gristmill once stood by the Tallapoosa River. Milstead was located at the junction of the Tallassee and Montgomery Railway and the Western Railway of Alabama.

Fort Decatur, a fort built during the Creek War, was located near Milstead. John Sevier died here while conducting a survey of Creek lands.

A post office operated under the name Cowle's Station from 1867 to 1895, under the name Cowles from 1895 to 1896, and under the name Milstead from 1896 to 1964.

Auburn University maintains the E.V. Smith Research Center in Milstead.

Gallery

References

Unincorporated communities in Macon County, Alabama
Unincorporated communities in Alabama